Shadowdale is the name of a fictional town and its surrounding areas in the Forgotten Realms line of Dungeons & Dragons products. It may refer to both
the town of Shadowdale
the novel Shadowdale, in The Avatar Series
Shadowdale (module), a game adventure taking place in the town
Shadowdale: The Scouring of the Land, a game book about the town